WESI-LP (92.3 FM) is a radio station licensed to serve the community of Sugar Hill, Georgia. The station is owned by Iglesia de Cristo Elim Georgia, Inc., and airs a Spanish religious format.

The station was assigned the WESI-LP call letters by the Federal Communications Commission on February 18, 2015.

References

External links
 Official Website
 FCC Public Inspection File for WESI-LP
 

ESI-LP
Radio stations established in 2017
2017 establishments in Georgia (U.S. state)
ESI-LP
Gwinnett County, Georgia
ESI-LP